is a passenger railway station located in the town of Sayō, Sayō District, Hyōgo Prefecture, Japan. It is operated by the third-sector semi-public railway operator Chizu Express.

Lines

Station layout
The station consists of two ground-level opposed side platforms connected to the station building by a level crossing. Platform 1 is the main line and is normally used for trains in both directions. Platform 2 is used only for changing trains and waiting for passing trains.

Platforms

Adjacent stations

|-
!colspan=5|Chizu Express

History
Hirafuku Station opened on December 3, 1994 with the opening of the Chizu Line.

Passenger statistics
In fiscal 2018, the station was used by an average of 26 passengers daily.

Surrounding area
 Hirafuku-juku on the Inaba Kaidō
 Hirafuku Folk Museum
Rikan Castle ruins

See also
List of railway stations in Japan

References

External links

Official home page

Railway stations in Hyōgo Prefecture
Railway stations in Japan opened in 1994
Sayō, Hyōgo